Małgorzata Pskit  (born 25 May 1976, in Łódź) is a retired Polish athlete specializing in the 400 metres hurdles.

Competition record

Personal bests
Outdoor
200m 24.86
400m 53.10 (Sopot 2002)
400m hurdles 54.75 (Athens 2004)
800m 2:04.88

Indoor
400m 53.23 (Madrid 2005)
600m 1:29.93 (Spała 2003)
800m 2:02.65 (Spała 2005)

External links

1976 births
Living people
Polish female sprinters
Polish female hurdlers
Sportspeople from Łódź
Athletes (track and field) at the 2004 Summer Olympics
Olympic athletes of Poland
European Athletics Championships medalists
Universiade medalists in athletics (track and field)
Skra Warszawa athletes
Universiade silver medalists for Poland
Medalists at the 2001 Summer Universiade